Achabal, known as Achival in Kashmiri, is a town in Anantnag district, in the union territory of  Jammu and Kashmir, India.

Achabal is an important tourist place about 8.1 km away from Anantnag. The place is notable for an ancient spring surrounded by a garden terraced and developed by the Mughals. The upper portion of the garden is called 'Bag-e-Begum Abad' developed by Malika Noor Jehan Begum in 1616 AD and renowned as Sahib Abad in which there is a Hamam (treasure of water) getting heat from a logical lamp (Tosnag).

Cascades and fountains have been erected by Mughal Emperors. A mosque standing in the garden is believed to have been 
constructed by Mughal Prince Dara Shikwah. Achabal was once the pleasure retreat of Empress Noor Jehan. A trout hatchery is also located nearby.
Achabal is the site of a Mughal garden called Achabal Gardens.

Geography
It has an average elevation of 1936 metres (6352 feet) above mean sea level.

History 
According to Kalhana's Rajatarangini Achabal(Sanskrit Akṣavāla) was founded by Akṣa son of King Nara II of Gonandiya dynasty.

Demographics
At the 2001 India census, Achabal had a population of 5835. Males constituted 53% of the population and females 47%. Achabal had an average literacy rate of 65%, higher than the national average of 59.5%; with 65% of the males and 35% of females literate. 12% of the population was under 6 years of age.

Nearest tehsils 
 Shangus
 Anantnag 
 Kokernag

References

Cities and towns in Anantnag district